Westmont station may refer to:

 Westmont station (Illinois), Westmont, Illinois
 Wesmont station (NJ Transit),  Wood-Ridge, New Jersey
 Westmont station (PATCO), Haddon Township, New Jersey

See also
 Westmount station, Westmount, Quebec, Canada